Epen is a village in the southern part of the Dutch province of Limburg. It is a part of the municipality of Gulpen-Wittem, and lies about 15 km southwest of Kerkrade. Epen is known for its timber framed houses and is part of the sightseeing tour the Mergellandroute.

The village was first mentioned in 1041 as "in villis ... Apine", and probably means "settlement near a river". Epen developed in the Early Middle Ages.

The Catholic St Paul Conversion Church is a single aisled church with a semi built-in tower with needle spire. The church was built between 1841 and 1842 and the tower was added between 1847 and 1848.

Epen was home to 443 people in 1840. After World War II, it started to developed as a tourist area.

Gallery

References

External links
 

Populated places in Limburg (Netherlands)
Gulpen-Wittem